The Shit Hits the Sheds was a concert tour by the American heavy metal band Metallica, which took place in 1994. The band played in 51 shows in North America, including a performance at Woodstock '94, which had an attendance of over 300,000 people.

Overview
This tour is also known for the debut of the song "The God That Failed", and Lars Ulrich's down-scaled drum kits. According to Ulrich's interview on guitar center in 2014, two rack toms were removed from his original drum setup, thus allowing the hi-hat cymbal and ride cymbal to be placed nearer to him and making his drum kit easier to play.

This was also the last tour that Metallica played in standard tuning before tuning down to E♭ standard due to James Hetfield's deteriorating vocals from the recent large-scale tour in support of Metallica (commonly known as the Black Album).

On the last date of the tour in Miami, the famed lead vocalist of Judas Priest, Rob Halford (who at the time was the lead vocalist for Fight), sang guest vocals on stage for a performance of "Rapid Fire" from his band's 1980 album British Steel.

Supporting acts
The supporting acts for this tour were Danzig, Suicidal Tendencies (whose bassist Robert Trujillo would join Metallica nine years later), Candlebox, and Fight.

Fight were a replacement for Alice in Chains, who were forced to withdraw from the tour due to lead vocalist Layne Staley's heroin addiction.  The Offspring (who had just released their breakthrough album Smash) were originally invited to replace Alice in Chains, but declined due to their desire to continue playing in clubs as well as logistical issues.  

Despite Alice in Chains' withdrawal from the tour, the band's guitarist, Jerry Cantrell, joined Metallica on "For Whom the Bell Tolls" during their August 9, 1994 performance in Oklahoma City, Oklahoma.

Typical setlist
(Taken from the Holmdel, New Jersey Garden State Arts Center show on June 1, 1994)

 "Breadfan" (Budgie cover)
 "Master of Puppets"
 "Wherever I May Roam"
 "Harvester of Sorrow"
 "Welcome Home (Sanitarium)"
 "The God That Failed"
 "Kill/Ride Medley"
 "Ride the Lightning"
"No Remorse"
"The Four Horsemen"
"Phantom Lord"
"Fight Fire With Fire"
 "For Whom the Bell Tolls"
 "Disposable Heroes"
 "Seek & Destroy"
 Guitar Solo
 "Nothing Else Matters"
 "Creeping Death"
 Bass Solo
 "Fade to Black"
 "Whiplash"

Encore:

  "Sad but True"
 "One"

Encore 2:

  "Enter Sandman"
 "So What?" (Anti-Nowhere League cover)

Tour dates

Personnel
 James Hetfield – lead vocals, rhythm guitar
 Kirk Hammett – lead guitar
 Jason Newsted – bass, backing vocals
 Lars Ulrich – drums

References

1994 concert tours
Metallica concert tours